Charles Beebe Stuart (June 4, 1814  – January 4, 1881) was an American engineer, United States Navy and Union Army officer and politician.

Biography
Stuart was born in Chittenango Springs, Madison County, New York, and was educated in the common schools. He graduated from Union College. Afterwards he was engaged in the construction of the Philadelphia, Wilmington and Baltimore Railroad, and the Brooklyn dry docks.

He was New York State Engineer and Surveyor from 1848 to 1849, elected on the Whig ticket. In November 1850, he was appointed Engineer-in-Chief, attached to the Bureau of Construction, Equipment and Repair of the  United States Navy.

During the American Civil War, he raised the 50th New York Engineer Regiment, commanding it from 1861 to 1863. He built fortifications and bridges for the Army of the Potomac.

He died in Cleveland, Ohio on January 4, 1881, of gangrene which developed from a sprained ankle. At the time of his death, he was as Chief Engineer engaged in the construction of the Conotton Valley Railway.

References

External links
Google Books The New York Civil List compiled by Franklin Benjamin Hough (pages 37f; Weed, Parsons and Co., 1858)

1814 births
1881 deaths
New York State Engineers and Surveyors
People from Chittenango, New York
Union College (New York) alumni
19th-century American railroad executives
People of New York (state) in the American Civil War
New York (state) Whigs
19th-century American politicians